Ján Kozák (born 22 April 1980) is a Slovak football coach and former player.

Club career
A midfielder, Kozák joined Bratislava in the year 2003, winning the Corgoň Liga with the club the very next season, 2004–05. He scored 7 goals in 34 appearances in the season.

In 2005–06, he played in 11 matches for the club, scoring three goals, before moving to West Bromwich Albion in January 2006. He made his debut for Albion on 4 February 2006, coming on as a substitute for Geoff Horsfield in a Premier League match against Blackburn Rovers. He was not considered good enough for the then manager Bryan Robson to sign, so left at the end of his loan spell.

He made his debut for Poli Timișoara in an away match at Gloria Bistriţa. On 21 July 2010, he was released.

Ján Kozák ended his career playing in the Austrian 2. Landesliga for DSG Union Perg. and SV Stripfing.

International career
He made his first appearance for Slovakia on 30 November 2004, a 1–0 win against Hungary.

Kozák has played in Euro 2008 qualifying and 2010 FIFA World Cup qualification. He was selected to take the captain's armband. He also made the squad for Slovakia's World Cup debut in 2010.

Managerial career
On 1 August 2015, he became the head coach of Slovan Bratislava B. He was named the interim manager of the first team in July 2019. After a successful spell as interim coach, Kozák was given the role on a permanent basis in August 2019. He subsequently progressed with Slovan into the group stage of Europa League and won the Slovak double. He was sacked by the club in September 2020.

Personal life
Kozak' father, Ján, was also former national player. He has 55 caps for Czechoslovakia and was also head coach of Slovakia. His nephew Filip Lesniak is also a professional footballer.

Footgolf
As a footgolfer, he won the bronze medal in the 2016 FootGolf World Cup held in Argentina.

Career statistics
Scores and results list Slovakia's goal tally first, score column indicates score after each Kozák goal.

Honours

Player
MFK Kosiče
Corgoň liga: 1997–98, 
Artmedia Petržalka
Corgoň liga: 2004–05, 2007–08
Slovak Cup: 2003–04 , 2007–08

Slovan Bratislava
Corgoň liga: 2009–10,

FC Bunyodkor
Uzbekistan Super League: 2013
Uzbekistan Cup: 2012

Manager
Slovan Bratislava
Fortuna Liga: 2019–20
Slovnaft Cup: 2019–20

Individual
Slovak Manager of the Year: 2019

References

External links
 
 
 
 
 
 

1980 births
Living people
Sportspeople from Košice
Slovak footballers
Association football midfielders
Slovakia international footballers
2010 FIFA World Cup players
Slovak Super Liga players
Czech First League players
Premier League players
Liga I players
Belgian Pro League players
FC VSS Košice players
FC Petržalka players
K.S.C. Lokeren Oost-Vlaanderen players
SK Slavia Prague players
West Bromwich Albion F.C. players
FC Politehnica Timișoara players
ŠK Slovan Bratislava players
Athlitiki Enosi Larissa F.C. players
FC Bunyodkor players
Slovak football managers
ŠK Slovan Bratislava managers
Slovak expatriate footballers
Slovak expatriate sportspeople in England
Expatriate footballers in England
Slovak expatriate sportspeople in Belgium
Expatriate footballers in Belgium
Slovak expatriate sportspeople in Romania
Expatriate footballers in Romania
Slovak expatriate sportspeople in Greece
Expatriate footballers in Greece
Slovak expatriate sportspeople in Uzbekistan
Expatriate footballers in Uzbekistan